James Hankins (born 1955) is an American intellectual historian specializing in the Italian Renaissance. He is the General Editor of the 
I Tatti Renaissance Library and the Associate Editor of the Catalogus Translationum et Commentariorum. He is a professor in the History Department of Harvard University. In Spring 2018, he is a Visiting Research Fellow at the University of Notre Dame Center for Ethics and Culture.

In 2012 he was honored with the Paul Oskar Kristeller Lifetime Achievement Award of the Renaissance Society of America.

Education and early career
Hankins was born in Philadelphia, Pennsylvania. He took an A.B. in Classics from Duke University (1977) and M.A., M.Phil. and Ph.D. degrees in History from Columbia University (1985). At Columbia he worked with Eugene F. Rice and the historian of philosophy Paul Oskar Kristeller, serving as the latter's research assistant for six years. In 1985 he joined the history faculty at Harvard University.

Work and recognition 
Hankins' monographic work centers on the history of philosophy, theology, literature and political thought. Since 1998 he has been General Editor of the I Tatti Renaissance Library, which he founded together with Walter Kaiser, Director of the Villa I Tatti, the Harvard University Center for Italian Renaissance Studies. Under Hankins' editorship the series has published over fifty volumes between 2001 and 2012 and sold close to 80,000 volumes. Since 2003 he has also been Associate Editor of the Catalogus Translationum et Commentariorum: Medieval and Renaissance Translations and Commentaries, Annotated Lists and Guides, a publication founded by his mentor Paul Oskar Kristeller in 1945. He is the author or editor of over twenty volumes and more than eighty articles, essays and book chapters. Many of his shorter writings are accessible online, via "Digital Access to Scholarship at Harvard" (DASH).

Hankins has been a Fulbright Scholar, a member of the Society of Fellows in the Humanities at Columbia University, a fellow and visiting professor at the Villa I Tatti, a Guggenheim fellow, a fellow of the American Academy in Berlin, a member of the Institute for Advanced Study, Princeton, and a recipient of the Rome Prize from the American Academy in Rome. In 2010 he was Carlyle Lecturer in the History of Political Thought at the University of Oxford. In 2014 he was elected a Corresponding Fellow of the British Academy.

Books 
 The Humanism of Leonardo Bruni, 1987 (ed. and tr.), with Gordan Griffiths
 Supplementum Festivum: Studies in Honor of Paul Oskar Kristeller, 1987 (ed.), with John Monfasani and Frederick Purnell
 Plato in the Italian Renaissance, 2 vols., 1990
 Repertorium Brunianum: A Critical Guide to the Writings of Leonardo Bruni, vol. 1, 1997
 Renaissance Civic Humanism: Reappraisals and Reflections, 2000 (ed.)
 The Lost Continent: Neo-Latin Literature and the Birth of European Vernacular Literatures, 2001 (ed.)
 Leonardo Bruni: History of the Florentine People, 3 vols. 2001-7 (ed. and tr.)
 Marsilio Ficino: Platonic Theology, 6 vols., 2001-6 (ed.)
 Catalogus Translationum et Commentariorum, vols. 8 (2003) and 9 (2011), Associate Editor
 Humanism and Platonism in the Italian Renaissance, 2 vols., 2003-4
 Maffeo Vegio: Short Epics, 2004 (ed.), with Michael C. J. Putnam
 The Cambridge Companion to Renaissance Philosophy, 2007 (ed.)
 The Recovery of Ancient Philosophy in the Renaissance, 2008, with Ada Palmer
 Aurelio Lippo Brandolini: Republics and Kingdoms Compared, 2009 (ed. and tr.)
 Virtue Politics. Soulcraft and Statecraft in Renaissance Italy, 2019
 Political Meritocracy in Renaissance Italy: The Virtuous Republic of Francesco Patrizi of Siena, 2023

References

21st-century American historians
21st-century American male writers
Living people
1955 births
Historians of the Renaissance
Corresponding Fellows of the British Academy
American male non-fiction writers
Duke University alumni
Columbia Graduate School of Arts and Sciences alumni
Columbia University faculty
Harvard University faculty